The common green gecko has been split into the following species:
 Auckland green gecko, Naultinus elegans
 Wellington green gecko, Naultinus punctatus